Southside Virginia Community College (SVCC) is a public community college with two campuses in Virginia, one near Alberta in Brunswick County, and the John H. Daniel Campus, just outside Keysville in Charlotte County.  It is part of the Virginia Community College System. It was founded in 1970 and has the largest geographic service area of any community college in the state, covering 10 counties and the city of Emporia.

The college offers classes at a number of off-campus sites and online. Major off-campus locations include the Southside Virginia Education Center, in Emporia; Southern Virginia Higher Education Center, in South Boston; Estes Community Center, in Chase City; Lake Country Advanced Knowledge Center, South Hill; and the SVCC Occupational/Technical Center in Blackstone. Along with these major sites, SVCC has many smaller off-campus sites scattered throughout its service region that serve a large number of students.

Dr. Alfred A. Roberts is the current president of SVCC. He has served as president since July 2014.

References

External links
Official website

Virginia Community College System
Educational institutions established in 1970
1970 establishments in Virginia
Universities and colleges accredited by the Southern Association of Colleges and Schools
Education in Brunswick County, Virginia
Education in Charlotte County, Virginia
Emporia, Virginia